Canteloup may refer to communes in France:

 Canteloup, Calvados, in the Calvados département 
 Canteloup, Manche, in the Manche département

See also
Cantaloupe (disambiguation)